The Chevrolet Series CA Eagle and Master is an American vehicle manufactured by Chevrolet in 1933 to replace the 1932 Series BA Confederate. The car was called "Eagle" early in the 1933 production year. When it was joined by the cheaper Chevrolet Standard Six (Series CC) later in February, 1933 the Eagle name was changed to "Master" to provide Chevrolet with a two-car range, and for the first time in ten years they manufactured two models on different wheelbases. Starting in 1926, GM introduced the short lived General Motors companion make program where Oakland, Oldsmobile, Buick and Cadillac had "companion" models added to each division (Pontiac, Viking, Marquette and LaSalle, respectively). The only division that didn't get a "junior" brand was Chevrolet; instead, the lower-priced Standard series was introduced.

The Series CA sold a combined 450,435 vehicles, an increase of nearly 140,000 over the previous year's Series BA sales of 313,395, and ensured that Chevrolet was able to retain their number one spot in American car sales. The Series CA saw the end of two-seater cars from Chevrolet, and the new Town Sedan included an integral trunk.

There are several differences between the Eagle and Master. The easiest way to distinguish between the two is the post between the front door vent windows and the roll down windows. On the Eagle the chrome divider between these two windows goes down as the window goes down, whereas on the Master this divider remains fixed and does not go down with the window. The Series CA's wheelbase increased an inch to  compared to the Series BA, and was three inches longer than the new Series CC Standard.

The engine powering the Series CA was a new, larger  version of the "Stovebolt Six", producing  @ 2800 rpm and 146 lb•ft @ 1000-1800 rpm. A smaller  six-cylinder was used in the Standard, producing .

GM also used the Eagle chassis and platform for trucks branded as both Chevrolet and GMC. In May of 1925 the Chevrolet Export Boxing plant at Bloomfield, New Jersey was repurposed from a previous owner where Knock-down kits for Chevrolet, Oakland, Oldsmobile, Buick and Cadillac passenger cars, and both Chevrolet and GMC truck parts were crated and shipped by railroad to the docks at Weehawken, New Jersey for overseas GM assembly factories.

See also
1933 Cadillac Series 355
1933 LaSalle Series 303
1933 Oldsmobile F-Series
1933 Buick Series 50
1933 Pontiac

References

Eagle
Cars introduced in 1933
1930s cars
Panel trucks